The Kurdistan List, also known as the Kurdistan Alliance or the Brotherhood List, is the name of the electoral coalition that ran in the Kurdistan Regional Government parliamentary elections in Iraqi Kurdistan in July 2009. The Kurdistan List represented a coalition of the two main ruling parties in Iraqi Kurdistan, namely the Kurdistan Democratic Party and the Patriotic Union of Kurdistan. It is the successor of the Democratic Patriotic Alliance of Kurdistan.

The head of the Kurdistan List was the former deputy prime minister of Iraq, Dr. Barham Salih (PUK), who was later elected as the new prime minister of Iraqi Kurdistan in September 2009. The Kurdistan List endorsed the incumbent and re-elected president of Kurdistan, Massoud Barzani (KDP).

2010 Iraqi elections
In the 2010 Iraqi parliamentary election there were 11 parties in the Kurdistani List, the largest ones were the:
Kurdistan Democratic Party - led by Kurdish President Massoud Barzani
Patriotic Union of Kurdistan- led by Iraqi President Jalal Talabani
Kurdistan Communist Party – Iraq -  led by Kamal Shakir
Islamic Movement of Kurdistan - led by Shaykh Uthman Abd-Aziz
Kurdistan Toilers' Party - led by Qadir Aziz
Turkmen Brotherhood Movement - led by Kalkhi Najmaddin Noureddin
Kurdistan Socialist Democratic Party

Seats

Votes

References

Defunct political party alliances in Iraq
Kurdish nationalism in Iraq
Kurdish nationalist political parties
Kurdish political parties in Iraq
Kurdish political party alliances
Political parties in Kurdistan Region
Yazidis in Iraq